The 1946 Turkish Football Championship was the 12th edition of the competition. It was held in May. Gençlerbirliği won their second national championship title by winning the Final Group in Ankara undefeated.

The champions of the three major regional leagues (Istanbul, Ankara, and İzmir) qualified directly for the Final Group. Eskişehir Demirspor qualified by winning the qualification play-off, which was contested by the winners of the regional qualification groups.

Final group

 1 After Altay's equalizer in the 28th minute was cancelled due to offside, the referee intended to send off an Altay player because of excessive protest. As a result the entire Altay team walked off. Beşiktaş were awarded the win with 2–1.

References

External links
RSSSF

Turkish Football Championship seasons
Turkish
Turkey